Gaildorf West station is a railway station in the municipality of Gaildorf, located in the Schwäbisch Hall district in Baden-Württemberg, Germany.

References

Railway stations in Baden-Württemberg
Buildings and structures in Schwäbisch Hall (district)
Railway stations in Germany opened in 1879